Anthony David McPartlin  (born 18 November 1975) is an English television presenter, former singer, rapper, comedian and actor. He is best known for working alongside Dec Donnelly as part of the presenting duo Ant & Dec.

McPartlin came to prominence, alongside Donnelly, in the children's drama series Byker Grove, with both of the boys establishing successful careers as television presenters, in which presented SMTV Live (between 1998 and 2001), I'm a Celebrity...Get Me Out of Here! and Ant & Dec's Saturday Night Takeaway (since 2002), and Britain's Got Talent (since 2007).

Other notable highlights of McPartlin's career alongside Donnelly include presenting PokerFace, Push the Button, Pop Idol, and Red or Black?, being hosts of charity appeal Text Santa (between 2011 and 2014), and also performing as pop music duo PJ & Duncan.

Career

McPartlin's first appearance on television was on the children's workshop programme Why Don't You?, but his big break came when he rose to prominence playing the character of PJ in the CBBC series Byker Grove. It was during his time on the programme that he first met Declan Donnelly, who was cast in the part of Duncan. The pair formed a close friendship on the programme, both socially and professionally, with the men performing as their characters until their departure from the programme in 1993. During their tenure, the pair created a number of hit records under the label of "PJ & Duncan AKA", including the song "Tonight I'm Free" that had been performed on Byker Grove.

From then onwards, McPartlin and Donnelly worked together on television, creating the presenting duo of Ant & Dec. Initially, the pair continued to work in children's television with the Saturday morning hit SMTV Live, before they eventually branched out into gameshows – Friends Like These, PokerFace and Push the Button – along with talent shows – Pop Idol, and Britain's Got Talent – and entertainment programmes – I'm a Celebrity... Get Me Out of Here!, and Ant & Dec's Saturday Night Takeaway. The pair continued to maintain work in acting, starring in a tribute to The Likely Lads, in the form of a remake of an episode from the show's sequel Whatever Happened to the Likely Lads? entitled "No Hiding Place". In 2006, McPartlin and Donnelly starred together in the film Alien Autopsy.

In 2007, it was discovered that two shows, Ant & Dec's Gameshow Marathon and Ant & Dec's Saturday Night Takeaway, which he co-presented with Donnelly, had defrauded viewers participating in phone-ins. The latter was produced by the pair's own production company.

In April 2009, Ant & Dec achieved wide international exposure when, as backstage commentators for Britain's Got Talent, they interviewed contestant Susan Boyle, whose audition would become the most-viewed YouTube video of the year and whose record album topped sales charts in dozens of countries.

Personal life
On 22 July 2006, McPartlin married his longtime girlfriend, make-up artist Lisa Armstrong at Cliveden, a country house hotel in Buckinghamshire. The couple were married for 11 years before eventually announcing on 15 January 2018 that they were divorcing.

McPartlin was a fervent Labour Party supporter until the 2010 election, when he voted for the Conservative Party. In February 2013, he told The Guardian newspaper that he would struggle to justify voting for either political party in the future.

In 2015, McPartlin went into hospital for an operation to treat his knee and was advised to take prescription drugs to combat pain after the surgery was botched. Over the course of the following two years, he slowly became addicted to taking the drugs (one of which being the opioid OxyContin) along with alcohol, including use before television appearances. 

In June 2017, he sought treatment for his addiction and checked himself in for rehabilitation; he was released two months later.

On 18 March 2018 McPartlin was involved in a road traffic collision in London, after which he was arrested on suspicion of drink-driving. The following day, on 19 March, he met with Dec and ITV and suspended further presenting duties to return to rehab for further treatment. On 16 April 2018, he was interviewed under caution and subsequently charged with drink-driving. McPartlin pleaded guilty to the offence at Wimbledon Magistrates' Court the following month, and was banned from driving for 20 months and fined £86,000, Britain's highest-ever penalty for drink-driving.

In August 2018 McPartlin announced he would be taking a break from television presenting duties until 2019, saying: "My recovery is going very well and for that to continue having spoken to Dec and ITV, I have made the decision to take the rest of the year off."

In January 2019, McPartlin returned to his television duties alongside Donnelly at the Britain's Got Talent auditions.

On 7 August 2021, McPartlin married Anne-Marie Corbett, who was formerly his personal assistant, at St Michael's Church in Heckfield, Hampshire. They had been in a relationship since 2018.

Charity
McPartlin and Donnelly are patrons of the charity Sunshine Fund. When their single "Let's Get Ready to Rhumble" reached No.1, Ant & Dec donated the single's success to the charity ChildLine. They also support the Text Santa appeal.

They opened the W4 Youth Centre in 2013.

Earnings
In 2007, McPartlin, with his on-screen presenting partner, Donnelly, signed a £30 million two-and-a-half-year contract with ITV.

Honours and awards
McPartlin was appointed an Officer of the Order of the British Empire (OBE) in the 2016 Birthday Honours for his services to broadcasting and entertainment.

The following listed below are the television awards that McPartlin has been nominated for or awarded with, primarily while working alongside Declan Donnelly as Ant & Dec:

1994
Brit Award Nomination – Best Song: "Let's Get Ready to Rhumble"

1995
Brit Award Nomination – British Breakthrough
Royal Television Society Awards- The Ant and Dec Show

1996
British Academy Children's Awards: Children's Entertainment Show (The Ant and Dec Show)

1997
Nominated – British Academy Children's Awards: Children's Entertainment Show (The Ant and Dec Show)

1998
British Academy Children's Awards: Children's Entertainment Show (Ant and Dec Unzipped)

2000
British Academy Children's Awards: Children's Entertainment Show (SMTV Live)
TV Choice Awards: Best Children's Show (SMTV Live)
Royal Television Society Awards: Best Children's Entertainment Programme (SMTV Live)
TV Hits Awards: Best Teen Show (CD:UK)
Loaded Carling Good Work Fellas Awards: Best Double Act
British Comedy Awards: The People's Choice (SMTV Live)

2001
TV Choice Awards: Best Children's Show (SMTV Live)
Broadcast Awards: Best Children's Programme (SMTV Live)
Royal Television Society Awards : Best Television Presenters
Disney Channel Awards: Kids Awards (The Ant and Dec Show)
Nominated – British Academy Children's Awards: Best Children's Entertainment Show (SMTV Live)

2002
Nominated – British Academy Television Awards: Entertainment Performance (Pop Idol)
British Academy Children's Awards: Children's Entertainment Show (SMTV Live)

2005
Nominated – British Academy Television Awards: Entertainment Performance (I'm a Celebrity... Get Me Out of Here!)

2006
British Comedy Awards: Best Comedy Entertainment Personality
British Comedy Awards: Best Comedy Entertainment Programme

2007
Nominated – British Academy Television Awards: Entertainment Performance (Ant & Dec's Saturday Night Takeaway)

2008
TV Quick & TV Choice Awards: Best Entertainment Show (Saturday Night Takeaway)
Nickelodeon UK Kids Choice Awards 2008: Favourite Funny Person, Best TV presenters and Best Family TV show (Britain's Got Talent)

2009
TV Quick & TV Choice Awards: Best Entertainment Show (Ant & Dec's Saturday Night Takeaway)
TV Quick & TV Choice Awards:Outstanding Contribution Award
Nominated – British Academy Television Awards: Entertainment Performance (I'm a Celebrity... Get Me Out of Here!)

2010
British Academy Television Awards: Entertainment Performance (I'm a Celebrity... Get Me Out of Here!)
British Academy Television Awards: Entertainment Programme (Britain's Got Talent)

2012
Freesat: Best TV Presenter(s)

2013
TRIC Awards: TV Personality of the Year
TRIC Awards: TRIC Special Award (I'm a Celebrity... Get Me Out of Here!)
RTS Awards: Entertainment Performance (I'm a Celebrity... Get Me Out of Here!)
Nominated – British Academy Television Awards: Entertainment Performance (I'm a Celebrity... Get Me Out of Here!)

2014
British Academy Television Awards: Entertainment Performance (Ant & Dec's Saturday Night Takeaway)
British Academy Television Awards: Entertainment Programme (Ant & Dec's Saturday Night Takeaway)

2015
British Academy Television Awards: Entertainment Performance (Ant & Dec's Saturday Night Takeaway)
British Academy Television Awards: Entertainment Programme (Ant & Dec's Saturday Night Takeaway'

2017
British Academy Television Awards: Entertainment Programme (Ant & Dec's Saturday Night Takeaway)
British Academy Television Awards: Live Event (The Queen's 90th Birthday Celebration)

2018
British Academy Television Awards: Entertainment Programme (Britain's Got Talent)

2019
Guinness World Records: Most NTA wins for Best Presenter won consecutively
British Academy Television Awards: Entertainment Programme (Britain's Got Talent)

National Television Awards

Filmography

Television

Film

Television advertisements

Apps
An official Saturday Night Takeaway app known as Studio Rush'' launched on 30 January 2013.

References

Notes

External links

 Official Ant & Dec Website
 

1975 births
Living people
Ant & Dec
Best Entertainment Performance BAFTA Award (television) winners
English male child actors
English male television actors
English people of Irish descent
English television presenters
Officers of the Order of the British Empire
Male actors from Newcastle upon Tyne
Musicians from Newcastle upon Tyne